The University of Manitoba Press (UMP) is an academic publishing house based at the University of Manitoba in Winnipeg. Founded in 1967, the UMP is the first university press in western Canada.

Publishing 12 to 14 books a year, UMP is regarded as a leading publisher of books with a focus on Indigenous history, Indigenous studies, and Canadiana. Editorially, the Press has given focus to such subjects as the Arctic and the North; ethnic and immigration studies; Indigenous languages; Canadian literary studies (especially Indigenous literature); and environmental, land use, and food studies.

Organization 
Its distribution is handled by UTP Distribution in Canada; Michigan State University Press in the US; and Eurospan Group internationally (EMEA, Asia-Pacific, Latin America, Caribbean).

UMP's publishing program is supported by the federal government via the Canada Book Fund, the Council for the Arts, and the Awards to Scholarly Publications Program (funded by the Social Sciences and Humanities Research Council); the provincial government via the Department of Sport, Culture, and Heritage, the Manitoba Arts Council, and the Manitoba Book Publishing Tax Credit; and Livres Canada Books.

UMP is also a member of the Association of Canadian University Presses.

Publications 
The University of Manitoba Press publishes 12 to 14 books a year, with its selection process involving a scholarly peer review; all UMP books go through rigorous review by external experts, followed by a review by the UMP editorial board.

The Press publishes various works exploring Indigenous history and studies (such as cultures of the Inuit, Anishinaabe, Cree, and Métis); Canadiana (such as Canadian history and literature), especially the culture and history of the Canadian Prairies; and Canadian-immigrant cultures (such as Italian, Japanese, Ukrainian, and Icelandic). In addition, it has given focus to such subjects as the Arctic and the North; ethnic studies; Indigenous languages; Canadian literary studies (especially Indigenous literature); and environmental, land use, and food studies.

UMP has also published academic works, such as the political history of Manitoba and the laws of early Iceland (translated into English), the latter first published by UMP in 1980.

Book series

References

External links
University of Manitoba Press
UMP Style Guide

Manitoba, University of, Press
University of Manitoba
Publishing companies established in 1967
1967 establishments in Manitoba
Publishing companies based in Manitoba
Mass media in Winnipeg